Purbachal New Town Project or formerly Purbachal Residential Model Town is the biggest planned township in Bangladesh. The project area consists of about 6,227 acres (25 square kilometer) land located in between the Shitalakhya and the Balu River at Rupgonj thana of Narayanganj District and at Kaligonj Thana of Gazipur District, in the northeastern side of Dhaka. The Township will be linked with twelve-lane expressway from the Airport Road/Pragati swarani crossing.

The distance is only 6.8 km. There will be provision of about 26,000 residential plots of different sizes, 62,000 apartments with all necessary infrastructure and urban facilities. RAJUK intends to plan and develop the area as self-contained new township with all modern facilities. By 2025 Japanese construction giant Kajima Corporation, along with their Bangladeshi partner Sikder Group, has announced to complete the construction of 142 storied supertall skyscraper Iconic Tower in Purbachal sector 19.

Background of the project 
Dhaka has now been turned into one of the busiest and densely populated cities. The dwelling places required for the large number of people are quite very inadequate. As a result, the residential areas of Dhaka city are turning into overcrowded dirty localities day by day and are creating an unhealthy environment. The pressure of population of Dhaka should be reduced by developing the surrounding area of Dhaka in a planned way and establishing more and better permanent residential accommodation for the vast population.

Consultants:
The total DAP area was divided into five groups and a number of small locations. These were awarded to five firms—Development Design Consultants, Engineering and Planning Consultants, GBL Group, Sheltech, and BETS Consulting Services.

Location 
Purbachal Residential Model Town Project is situated at Rupganj Upazila of Narayanganj District and Kaliganj Upazila of Gazipur District in between river Balu and Sitalakhya at a distance of 16 km from zero point of Dhaka. The project implementation period is July 1995 to June 2014. The total area is 6,150 acres which is divided into thirty sectors. Out of which development works are going on in 4,500 acres (Narayangonj part).

Land use plan major components 
 Residential Plots - 38.74%
 Road network - 25.9%
 Physical & social infrastructure - 3.04%
 Lake - 7.1%
 Administrative and commercial plots - 6.41%
 Education & institution - 6%
 Neighbourhood/play field -2.5%

Present condition 

Site development works of sector 1–5, 11 to 14 & 17 have nearly been completed. For other sectors the site development works are progressing smoothly. Estimate for site development at Gazipur part has been completed and tendering for execution is under process. Road construction works in sector no 1 to 5, 11, 13, 14 & 17 have nearly been completed. For other sectors the road construction works are ongoing. At 1st phase 7 no.s of bridge construction work are ongoing. At 2nd phase 4 no.s of bridge construction work are ongoing. Rest of the bridges are in the process of tendering. Necessary actions are being taken for establishing of utility services viz electricity, gas, water supply, sewerage and telecommunication etc. through the connection authority. The handing over of plots in the sectors 4, 5 and 17 has started in March 2011. Handing over of plot in the sectors 3, 11, 12,13 and 14 is expected to be started quickly.

It may take five more years to hand over plots to 25,000 owners, who have fallen in uncertainty. The stipulated time to complete the project was 2008. But it may take more time as only 25 per cent work had so far been completed. 
According to the project map, there will be 10 bridges, but no tender to this effect was floated. Only 15 kilometer roads inside the project have been completed out of 140 kilometers in the sectors 1, 4, 5, 11, and 17. The handing over of plots in the sectors 4, 5 and 17 has been started. 
No necessary steps have been taken for establishing utility services like electricity, gas, water supply, sewerage and telecommunications.

Works under the project 
 Purbachal Expressway
 Dhaka University new campus.
 Bangabandhu Tri-tower
 Sheikh Hasina International Cricket Stadium
 Central Business District
 Bangabandhu Bangladesh–China Friendship Exhibition Center
 Dhaka Bypass Expressway

References 

Purbachal
Urban Projects of RAJUK
Dhaka
Narayanganj District
Gazipur District
1995 establishments in Bangladesh
Satellite cities